Anisolabis mauiensis is a species of earwig in the genus Anisolabis, the family Anisolabididae, the suborder Forficulina, and the order Dermaptera.

References

Anisolabididae
Insects described in 1979